Samuel Arthur Odoi-Sykes is a Ghanaian politician, lawyer and diplomat who was Ghana's High Commissioner to Canada from 2001 to 2006. He was National Chairman of the New Patriotic Party from 1998 to 2001 during which the party won its first presidential victory in the Fourth Republic. In the Third Republic, he was Member of Parliament for Ashiedu Keteke (Accra Central) and the Minority Leader of Parliament.

Early life
Samuel Arthur Odoi Sykes was born in Accra. He graduated with a History degree from the University of Ghana, Legon. Whilst there, he was General Secretary of the National Union of Ghana Students and founder and leader of the student wing of United Party at the University of Ghana.  Odoi-Sykes studied law at the University of London and qualified as a Barrister-at-Law at the Innner Temple before being admitted at the Ghana bar. Odoi-Sykes also studied for a diploma in "Foreign Policy of the United States" at the School of Advanced International Studies, Johns Hopkins University, Washington, D.C.

Career
He began his career as a teacher at the Abuakwa State College, Kyebi, in the Eastern Region.
He later joined the Ministry of Information as an Information Officer. In 1963 he joined the Foreign Service and was sent as first secretary of the Ghana High Commission to India, New Delhi. In 1963 he was re-attached to be responsible for public relations in Ghana's Embassy in Washington, D.C. as Press Attaché. He was director of the Department of Information Services of Ghana in the United States and the Caribbean. He was made director of the Overseas Information Directorate for the Ministry of Foreign Affairs in Accra. He was Minister Counselor and Deputy Ambassador to the Soviet Union, Moscow. He was Deputy High Commissioner in London until the 1972 Ghanaian coup which saw the saw the shutdown of the Ghanaian diplomatic mission in London. Odoi-Sykes served as a senior administrative officer in the Commonwealth Secretariat, London.

Politics
He was a founding member of the Progress Party in 1969. That same year he was elected as a member of the Accra Municipal Council.

He was also a founding member of the Popular Front Party.
In 1979 he was elected as a member of Parliament of the Third Republic by the Accra Central Constituency (Ashiedu Keteke) as a candidate of the Popular Front Party and served as leader of the parliamentary faction for the Popular Front Party in Parliament.

He was a member of the National Executive Committee of the New Patriotic Party. From 1998 to 2001 he was national chairman of the New Patriotic Party and led the party to victory in the national presidential and legislative elections in December 2000.  
 
From October 2001, he was Ghana's High Commissioner to Canada, Ottawa.

Sources

1928 births
Living people
Alumni of the University of London
Alumni of the Accra Academy
Ghanaian diplomats
Johns Hopkins University alumni
Ghanaian MPs 1979–1981
New Patriotic Party politicians
Popular Front Party politicians
United Party (Ghana) politicians
University of Ghana alumni
Ghanaian expatriates in the United Kingdom
Ghanaian expatriates in the United States
Ghanaian expatriates in India
Ghanaian expatriates in the Soviet Union